Bernard Francis Smyth (11 February 1891 – 15 July 1972) was a New Zealand rugby union player.

Playing career
A hooker, Smyth played a single representative game for Canterbury in 1915, one match for the South Island in 1922 and was a member of the New Zealand national side, the All Blacks, also in 1922. He played three matches for the All Blacks but did not appear in any internationals.

Military service
Smyth served in the No. 3 Field Company, New Zealand Engineers, during World War I. He enlisted in December 1915 as a sapper, and had risen to the rank of sergeant by the time of his discharge in June 1919. He saw action at Ypres, Passchendaele and the Somme, and was mentioned in dispatches, by Sir Douglas Haig on 7 April 1918.

Death and legacy
Smyth died in Christchurch on 15 July 1972, and was buried at Memorial Park Cemetery in Bromley. His grandson is the politician, Peter Dunne.

References

1891 births
1972 deaths
New Zealand rugby union players
New Zealand international rugby union players
Canterbury rugby union players
Rugby union hookers
New Zealand military personnel of World War I
New Zealand people of Irish descent
Burials at Memorial Park Cemetery, Christchurch
Rugby union players from West Coast, New Zealand